James Hezekiah Law (born December 28, 1899) was an American football player and coach, basketball coach, and college athletics administrator. He served as the head football coach at Lincoln University in Pennsylvania in 1922, Morgan College—now known as Morgan State University—in Baltimore from 1924 to 1925, and Prairie View Normal and Industrial College—now known as Prairie View A&M University—in Prairie View, Texas, compiling a career college football coaching record of 32–14–5.

Playing career
Law was the captain of Lincoln's football team in 1921.

Coaching career
Law was the second head football coach at Prairie View A&M University in Prairie View, Texas, and he held that position for four seasons, from 1926 until 1929. His record at Prairie View was 20–9–5.

Head coaching record

Football

References

1899 births
Year of death missing
Lincoln Lions athletic directors
Lincoln Lions football coaches
Lincoln Lions football players
Morgan State Bears football coaches
Prairie View A&M Panthers football coaches
People from Kimball, West Virginia
African-American coaches of American football
African-American players of American football
African-American basketball coaches
African-American college athletic directors in the United States
20th-century African-American sportspeople